Monstserrat Ginesta Clavell (born 1952 Seva, Barcelona) is a Spanish illustrator and writer.

Life 
Ginesta was born on  8 January 1952 in Seva, Barcelona. She studied at the School of Arts and Crafts in Barcelona and is currently one of the most important illustrators of children's literature.

In addition to publishing, Ginesta has worked in advertising, in cinema with the short film Ploma Daurad, and in theater, where she created scenographies.

Ginesta draws covers for magazines and books for adults, writes and illustrates books of children's and young people's literature in collaboration with different artists.  She is director of the magazine Tretzevents. 
Her books are published in all the official languages of Spain.

Awards 
1982 Prize Critica Serra d'Or for " El barret d'en Jan ".
1982 Illustration Award of the Generalitat of Catalonia for " L'ocell maravellòs ".
1987 Lazarillo Prize for "Gargantùa".
1988 National Award of Illustration for "The cow in the jungle".
1994 National Award for Illustration by "En Joantoxto".
1995 Prize Critica Serra d'Or for the collection Els artÃstics cases d'en Fricando.

Works 
Los habitantes de Llano Lejano (1987)
Pluma Dorada (1987)
La caja amarilla (1988)
La caja azul (1988)
La caja roja (1988)
Fumar o no fumar : esa es la (1988)
El sombrero de Juan (1988)
Los tres pelos del diablo (1988)
Valle de los ecos, el (1988)
El habitante de la nada (1989)
Cuadernos de grafías. Guía didáctica (1990)
El sombrero amarillo : Asociación, identificación (1990)
El sombrero azul : lateralidad (1990)
El sombrero rojo : relaciones (1990)
El Sombrero verde : gradaciones8 (1990)
Zapato amarillo, el (1990)
Zapato azul, el (1990)
Zapato rojo, el (1990)
Zapato verde, el (1990)
Burbujita (1991)
Cuando llega la noche (1991)
Cuentopostales (1991)
La boca risueña (1992)
Caperucita roja (1992)
El traje nuevo del emperador (1992)
El muro de piedra (1994)
Las tres tías (1994)
El lápiz fantástico (1996)
El cocodrilo amarillo (1997)
El cocodrilo verde (1997)
El león azul (1997)
EL cocodrilo rojo (1998)
Una dulce mirada (1998)
El león amarillo (1998)
El león rojo (1998)
El león verde (1998)
Yo, león (1998)
El gato con botas (1999)
Los tres osos (1999)
Casa por la ventana 2 (2000)
La casa por la ventana (2000)
El Cocodrilo azul (2000)
¡Despiértalos! (2000)
Mil y una noches 1 (2000)
La tienda de las mil y una noches (2000)
Duende o cosa (2001)
La giganta y chiquitín (2002)
Glup-Glup (2002)
Gruñi se esconde (2002)
¡Vamos, Gruñi! (2002)
Bensuf, el relojero (2003)
Dedo a dedo son diez (2003)
La giganta y el cuervo negro (2003)
El pájaro maravilloso (2005)
Consejos para las niñas buenas (2006)
Gruñi ¿bailas? (2007)
Gruñi se disfraza (2007)
Percevan 4, El país de Aslor (2008)
Celia Viñas para niños y niñas y otros seres curiosos (2009)
En el cuarto de los niños (2009)
Masaje de los tejidos profundos : guía visual de las técnicas (2009)
¡Qué paisaje! (2009)
Tino Calabacín (2010)
La gallina que pudo ser princesa (2011)
Cuentos largos como una sonrisa (2012)
Mandales de Gaudí (2012)

References

External links

 http://elem.mx/autor/datos/108288

1952 births
Living people
Spanish women illustrators
Spanish women writers